Fugong County is a county located in Nujiang Lisu Autonomous Prefecture, in the west of Yunnan province, China, bordering Myanmar's Kachin State to the west.

Administrative divisions
Fugong County has 1 town, 5 townships and 1 ethnic township. 
1 town
 Shangpa
5 townships

1 ethnic township
 Pihe Nu

Climate

See also
Three Parallel Rivers of Yunnan Protected Areas - Unesco World Heritage Site

References

External links
Fugong County

County-level divisions of Nujiang Prefecture